Gilbride is a surname. Notable people with the surname include:

Eugene Gilbride (1892–1972), Irish farmer and politician
Kevin Gilbride (born 1951), American football coach
Kevin M. Gilbride (born 1979), American football coach, son of Kevin
Patrick J. Gilbride (born 1992), Professional MMA Fighter, son of John